Austin Clarke may refer to:

Austin Clarke (poet) (1896–1974), Irish poet
Austin Clarke (politician) (1896–1945), Canadian politician in Manitoba
Austin Clarke (novelist) (1934–2016), Canadian novelist, essayist and short story writer

See also
Austin Clark (1880–1954), American zoologist